William George Hawtry Bankes VC (11 September 1836 – 6 April 1858) was an English recipient of the Victoria Cross, the highest and most prestigious award for gallantry in the face of the enemy that can be awarded to British and Commonwealth forces.

He was educated at Westminster School, and in 1857 enlisted in the Army.

Bankes was 21 years old, and a Cornet in the 7th Hussars (The Queen's Own), British Army during the Indian Mutiny when the following deed on 19 March 1858 at Lucknow in India took place for which he was awarded the VC as published in the London Gazette:

As Bankes was dying Queen Victoria wrote of his plight in a letter to the Princess Royal:

Bankes was awarded the VC when the award criteria for the medal was amended to allow posthumous awards.

The Medal
His Victoria Cross is displayed at the Lord Ashcroft Gallery, Imperial War Museum, London. A copy VC is on display alongside his portrait at Kingston Lacy, Dorset, England.

References

 Reference
Burial location of William Bankes "India"
Location of William Bankes' Victoria Cross "Queen's Own Hussars Museum"

1836 births
1858 deaths
People educated at Westminster School, London
People from Wimborne Minster
7th Queen's Own Hussars officers
British recipients of the Victoria Cross
Indian Rebellion of 1857 recipients of the Victoria Cross
British military personnel killed in the Indian Rebellion of 1857
British Army recipients of the Victoria Cross